The Sugar River is a  river in Roscommon and Gladwin counties in the U.S. state of Michigan. It is a tributary of the Tittabawassee River, which flows to the Saginaw River.

See also
List of rivers of Michigan

References

Michigan  Streamflow Data from the USGS

Rivers of Michigan
Rivers of Roscommon County, Michigan
Tributaries of Lake Huron